The men's 66 kg tournament in judo at the 2008 Summer Olympics was held on August 10 at the Beijing Science and Technology University Gymnasium. Preliminary rounds were held at 12:00 pm CST. Repechage finals, semifinals, bouts for bronze medals and the final took place at 8:00 pm CST.

This event was the second-lightest of the men's judo weight classes, limiting competitors to a maximum of 66 kilograms of body mass. Like all other judo events, bouts lasted five minutes. If the bout was still tied at the end, it was extended for another five-minute, sudden-death period; if neither judoka scored during that period, the match is decided by the judges. The tournament bracket consisted of a single-elimination contest culminating in a gold medal match. There was also a repechage to determine the winners of the two bronze medals. Each judoka who had lost to a semifinalist competed in the repechage. The two judokas who lost in the semifinals faced the winner of the opposite half of the bracket's repechage in bronze medal bouts.

Tournament results

Final

Mat 1

Mat 2

Repechage

Final ranking

References

Beijing 2008 - Judo: Men's −66 kg - official results
 Competition format

External links
 

M66
Judo at the Summer Olympics Men's Half Lightweight
Men's events at the 2008 Summer Olympics